The 2018–19 Los Angeles Lakers season was the franchise's 71st season, its 70th season in the National Basketball Association (NBA), and its 59th in Los Angeles.

Following the signing of NBA superstar and then 3-time champion LeBron James on July 1, 2018, the Lakers hoped to finish with a winning record and playoff appearance for the first time since the 2012–13 season. However, after an improved 20–14 start to the season, several injuries accumulated throughout the season including James, Rajon Rondo, Lonzo Ball, and Brandon Ingram, and the Lakers fell below .500 by the All-Star break. By March, the Lakers were eliminated from playoff contention, extending the team's postseason drought to a franchise record six seasons, and a sixth straight losing season, even after improving from their 2017–18 campaign by two games. It is the first time that James missed the playoffs since 2005 and first time he did not appear in the NBA Finals since 2010. This was the last time until 2022 that the Lakers missed the playoffs.

On April 9, the conclusion of the Lakers' season, Magic Johnson stepped down as president of basketball operations. Three days later, Luke Walton and the team agreed to part ways.

Draft

Roster

Roster Notes
 Point guard Lonzo Ball played 47 games (his last game being on January 19, 2019) but missed the rest of the season due to a Grade 3 left ankle sprain.
 Shooting guard Josh Hart played 67 games (his last game being on March 19, 2019) but missed the remainder of the season after having an ultrasonic debridement procedure on the patella tendon in his right knee.
 Small forward Brandon Ingram played 52 games (his last game being on March 2, 2019) but missed the rest of the season after being diagnosed with a deep venous thrombosis in his right arm. He underwent successful thoracic outlet decompression surgery on his right arm on March 16, 2019.

Standings

Division

Conference

Game log

Preseason

|- style="background:#fcc;"
| 1
| September 30
| Denver
| 
| JaVale McGee (17)
| McGee, Rondo (7)
| Rajon Rondo (11)
| Valley View Casino Center13,565
| 0–1
|- style="background:#fcc;"
| 2
| October 2
| Denver
| 
| JaVale McGee (15)
| JaVale McGee (8)
| Rajon Rondo (7)
| Staples Center18,997
| 0–2
|- style="background:#bfb;"
| 3
| October 4
| Sacramento
| 
| Brandon Ingram (31)
| Brandon Ingram (9)
| Lance Stephenson (5)
| Staples Center18,997
| 1–2
|- style="background:#fcc;"
| 4
| October 6
| LA Clippers
| 
| Kyle Kuzma (15)
| JaVale McGee (9)
| Rajon Rondo (10)
| Honda Center18,040
| 1–3
|- style="background:#bfb;"
| 5
| October 10
| Golden State
| 
| Brandon Ingram (26)
| LeBron James (10)
| Rajon Rondo (7)
| T-Mobile Arena1,763
| 2–3
|- style="background:#bfb;"
| 6
| October 12
| @ Golden State
| 
| Sviatoslav Mykhailiuk (22)
| Johnathan Williams (12)
| Lonzo Ball (7)
| SAP Center18,523
| 3–3

Regular season

|- bgcolor=ffcccc
| 1
| October 18
| @ Portland
| 
| LeBron James (26)
| LeBron James (12)
| Rajon Rondo (11)
| Moda Center19,996
| 0–1
|- bgcolor=ffcccc
| 2
| October 20
| Houston
| 
| LeBron James (24)
| Rajon Rondo (7)
| Rajon Rondo (10)
| Staples Center18,997
| 0–2
|- bgcolor=ffcccc
| 3
| October 22
| San Antonio
| 
| Kyle Kuzma (37)
| Josh Hart (10)
| LeBron James (14)
| Staples Center18,997
| 0–3
|- bgcolor=ccffcc
| 4
| October 24
| @ Phoenix
| 
| Lance Stephenson (23)
| Lance Stephenson (8)
| LeBron James (10)
| Talking Stick Resort Arena18,055
| 1–3
|- bgcolor=ccffcc
| 5
| October 25
| Denver
| 
| LeBron James (28)
| LeBron James (11)
| LeBron James (11)
| Staples Center18,997
| 2–3
|- bgcolor=ffcccc
| 6
| October 27
| @ San Antonio
| 
| LeBron James (35)
| LeBron James (11)
| Rajon Rondo (5)
| AT&T Center18,589
| 2–4
|- bgcolor=ffcccc
| 7
| October 29
| @ Minnesota
| 
| LeBron James (29)
| LeBron James (10)
| Rajon Rondo (8)
| Target Center18,978
| 2–5
|- bgcolor=ccffcc
| 8
| October 31
| Dallas
| 
| LeBron James (29)
| JaVale McGee (15)
| Lonzo Ball (7)
| Staples Center18,997
| 3–5

|- bgcolor=ccffcc
| 9
| November 3
| @ Portland
| 
| LeBron James (28)
| Rajon Rondo (10)
| LeBron James (7)
| Moda Center19,848
| 4–5
|- bgcolor=ffcccc
| 10
| November 4
| Toronto
| 
| Kyle Kuzma (24)
| Lonzo Ball (9)
| LeBron James (6)
| Staples Center18,997
| 4–6
|- bgcolor=ccffcc
| 11
| November 7
| Minnesota
| 
| LeBron James (24)
| LeBron James (10)
| Rajon Rondo (10)
| Staples Center18,997
| 5–6
|-bgcolor=ccffcc
| 12
| November 10
| @ Sacramento
| 
| LeBron James (25)
| Tyson Chandler (12)
| Rajon Rondo (7)
| Golden 1 Center17,583
| 6–6
|-bgcolor=ccffcc
| 13
| November 11
| Atlanta
| 
| LeBron James (26)
| JaVale McGee (9)
| Lonzo Ball (11)
| Staples Center18,997
| 7–6
|-bgcolor=ccffcc
| 14
| November 14
| Portland
|
| LeBron James (44)
| LeBron James (10)
| LeBron James (9)
| Staples Center18,997
| 8–6
|-bgcolor=ffcccc
| 15
| November 17
| @ Orlando
| 
| LeBron James (22)
| Kuzma, Stephenson, Ingram (6)
| Ingram, James (7)
| Amway Center19,249
| 8–7
|- bgcolor=ccffcc
| 16
| November 18
| @ Miami
| 
| LeBron James (51)
| Tyson Chandler (11)
| Lonzo Ball (7)
| American Airlines Arena19,686
| 9–7
|-bgcolor=ccffcc
| 17
| November 21
| @ Cleveland
| 
| LeBron James (32)
| LeBron James (14)
| LeBron James (7)
| Quicken Loans Arena19,432
| 10–7
|-bgcolor=ccffcc
| 18
| November 23
| Utah
| 
| Brandon Ingram (24)
| Ball, James (10)
| LeBron James (7)
| Staples Center18,997
| 11–7
|-bgcolor=ffcccc
| 19
| November 25
| Orlando
| 
| LeBron James (24)
| Lonzo Ball (10)
| LeBron James (7)
| Staples Center18,997
| 11–8
|-bgcolor=ffcccc
| 20
| November 27
| @ Denver
| 
| Kyle Kuzma (21)
| LeBron James (7)
| Kuzma, Stephenson, Hart (3)
| Pepsi Center19,583
| 11–9
|-bgcolor=ccffcc
| 21
| November 29
| Indiana
| 
| LeBron James (38)
| Chandler, James, Kuzma (9)
| LeBron James (7)
| Staples Center18,997
| 12–9
|-bgcolor=ccffcc
| 22
| November 30
| Dallas
| 
| LeBron James (28)
| Kyle Kuzma (12)
| Kyle Kuzma (6)
| Staples Center18,997
| 13–9

|-bgcolor=ccffcc
| 23
| December 2
| Phoenix
| 
| Kyle Kuzma (23)
| Tyson Chandler (11)
| LeBron James (8)
| Staples Center18,997
| 14–9
|-bgcolor=ccffcc
| 24
| December 5
| San Antonio
| 
| LeBron James (42)
| Chandler, Kuzma (9)
| Lonzo Ball (9)
| Staples Center18,997
| 15–9
|-bgcolor=ffcccc
| 25
| December 7
| @ San Antonio
| 
| LeBron James (35)
| Javale McGee (12)
| Ball, James (11)
| AT&T Center18,354
| 15–10
|-bgcolor=ccffcc
| 26
| December 8
| @ Memphis
| 
| Kuzma, James (20)
| Tyson Chandler (14)
| LeBron James (9)
| FedExForum17,794
| 16–10
|-bgcolor=ccffcc
| 27
| December 10
| Miami
| 
| Kyle Kuzma (33)
| LeBron James (9)
| LeBron James (12)
| Staples Center18,997
| 17–10
|-bgcolor=ffcccc
| 28
| December 13
| @ Houston
| 
| LeBron James (29)
| Tyson Chandler (8)
| Lonzo Ball (8)
| Toyota Center18,055
| 17–11
|-bgcolor=ccffcc
| 29
| December 15
| @ Charlotte
| 
| LeBron James (24)
| LeBron James (12)
| LeBron James (11)
| Spectrum Center19,641
| 18–11
|- bgcolor=ffcccc
| 30
| December 16
| @ Washington
| 
| Kentavious Caldwell-Pope (25)
| Tyson Chandler (7)
| Caldwell-Pope, Stephenson (5)
| Capital One Arena20,409
| 18–12
|-bgcolor=ffcccc
| 31
| December 18
| @ Brooklyn
| 
| LeBron James (36)
| LeBron James (13)
| LeBron James (8)
| Barclays Center17,735
| 18–13
|-bgcolor=ccffcc
| 32
| December 21
| New Orleans
| 
| Kyle Kuzma (23)
| LeBron James (12)
| LeBron James (14)
| Staples Center18,997
| 19–13
|-bgcolor=ffcccc
| 33
| December 23
| Memphis
| 
| LeBron James (22)
| LeBron James (14)
| LeBron James (7)
| Staples Center18,997
| 19–14
|-bgcolor=ccffcc
| 34
| December 25
| @ Golden State
| 
| Kyle Kuzma (19)
| LeBron James (13)
| Rajon Rondo (10)
| Oracle Arena19,596
| 20–14
|-bgcolor=ffcccc
| 35
| December 27
| @ Sacramento
| 
| Kyle Kuzma (33)
| Tyson Chandler (10)
| Lonzo Ball (12)
| Golden 1 Center17,583
| 20–15
|-bgcolor=ffcccc
| 36
| December 28
| LA Clippers
| 
| Kyle Kuzma (24)
| Tyson Chandler (15)
| Lonzo Ball (6)
| Staples Center18,997
| 20–16
|-bgcolor=ccffcc
| 37
| December 30
| Sacramento
| 
| Kentavious Caldwell-Pope (26)
| JaVale McGee (12)
| Brandon Ingram (9)
| Staples Center18,997
| 21–16

|-bgcolor=ffcccc
| 38
| January 2
| Oklahoma City
| 
| Kentavious Caldwell-Pope (25)
| Josh Hart (15)
| Lonzo Ball (7)
| Staples Center18,997
| 21–17
|-bgcolor=ffcccc
| 39
| January 4
| New York
| 
| Brandon Ingram (21)
| Ingram, McGee (9)
| Lance Stephenson (7)
| Staples Center18,997
| 21–18
|-bgcolor=ffcccc
| 40
| January 6
| @ Minnesota
| 
| Lance Stephenson (14)
| Tyson Chandler (10)
| Lance Stephenson (6)
| Target Center18,978
| 21–19
|-bgcolor=ccffcc
| 41
| January 7
| @ Dallas
| 
| Brandon Ingram (29)
| Josh Hart (12)
| Hart, Ingram (6)
| American Airlines Center20,354
| 22–19
|-bgcolor=ccffcc
| 42
| January 9
| Detroit
| 
| Kyle Kuzma (41)
| Ingram, Zubac (9)
| Lonzo Ball (11)
| Staples Center18,997
| 23–19
|- bgcolor=ffcccc
| 43
| January 11
| @ Utah
| 
| Michael Beasley (17)
| Kuzma, McGee (9)
| Lonzo Ball (6)
| Vivint Smart Home Arena18,306
| 23–20
|-bgcolor=ffcccc
| 44
| January 13
| Cleveland
| 
| Kyle Kuzma (29)
| Kyle Kuzma (9)
| Lonzo Ball (8)
| Staples Center18,997
| 23–21
|-bgcolor=ccffcc
| 45
| January 15
| Chicago
| 
| Lonzo Ball (19)
| Kyle Kuzma (12)
| Brandon Ingram (7)
| Staples Center18,997
| 24–21
|-bgcolor=ccffcc
| 46
| January 17
| @ Oklahoma City
| 
| Kyle Kuzma (31)
| Ivica Zubac (12)
| Brandon Ingram (11)
| Chesapeake Energy Arena18,203
| 25–21
|- bgcolor=ffcccc
| 47
| January 19
| @ Houston
| 
| Kyle Kuzma (32)
| JaVale McGee (14)
| Lonzo Ball (11)
| Toyota Center18,055
| 25–22
|- bgcolor=ffcccc
| 48
| January 21
| Golden State
| 
| Ivica Zubac (18)
| JaVale McGee (9)
| Lance Stephenson (5)
| Staples Center18,997
| 25–23
|-bgcolor=ffcccc
| 49
| January 24
| Minnesota
| 
| Brandon Ingram (20)
| Ivica Zubac (8)
| Rajon Rondo (13)
| Staples Center18,997
| 25–24
|-bgcolor=ccffcc
| 50
| January 27
| Phoenix
| 
| Caldwell-Pope, Zubac (24)
| Ivica Zubac (16)
| Rajon Rondo (11)
| Staples Center18,997
| 26–24
|-bgcolor=ffcccc
| 51
| January 29
| Philadelphia
| 
| Brandon Ingram (36)
| JaVale McGee (14)
| Rajon Rondo (11)
| Staples Center18,997
| 26–25
|-bgcolor=ccffcc
| 52
| January 31
| @ LA Clippers
| 
| LeBron James (24)
| LeBron James (14)
| LeBron James (9)
| Staples Center19,068
| 27–25

|-bgcolor=ffcccc
| 53
| February 2
| @ Golden State
| 
| Brandon Ingram (20)
| Ivica Zubac (9)
| Rajon Rondo (11)
| Oracle Arena19,596
| 27–26
|-bgcolor=ffcccc
| 54
| February 5
| @ Indiana
| 
| LeBron James (18)
| LeBron James (7)
| LeBron James (9)
| Bankers Life Fieldhouse17,265
| 27–27
|-bgcolor=ccffcc
| 55
| February 7
| @ Boston
| 
| LeBron James (28)
| LeBron James (12)
| LeBron James (12)
| TD Garden18,624
| 28–27
|-bgcolor=ffcccc
| 56
| February 10
| @ Philadelphia
| 
|Kyle Kuzma (39)
|JaVale McGee (13)
|LeBron James (9)
|Wells Fargo Center18,624
| 28–28
|-bgcolor=ffcccc
| 57
| February 12
| @ Atlanta
| 
| LeBron James (28)
| LeBron James (11)
| LeBron James (16)
| State Farm Arena16,824
| 28–29
|-bgcolor=ccffcc
| 58
| February 21
| Houston
| 
| LeBron James (29)
| Brandon Ingram (13)
| Rajon Rondo (7)
| Staples Center18,997
| 29–29
|-bgcolor=ffcccc
| 59
| February 23
| @ New Orleans
| 
| Brandon Ingram (29)
| Kyle Kuzma (8)
| LeBron James (12)
| Smoothie King Center18,626
| 29–30
|-bgcolor=ffcccc
| 60
| February 25
| @ Memphis
| 
| Brandon Ingram (32)
| LeBron James (12)
| LeBron James (11)
| FedExForum17,794
| 29–31
|-bgcolor=ccffcc
| 61
| February 27
| New Orleans
| 
| LeBron James (33)
| Rajon Rondo (7)
| Rajon Rondo (16)
| Staples Center18,997
| 30–31

|-bgcolor=ffcccc
| 62
| March 1
| Milwaukee
| 
| James, Ingram (31)
| Rondo, Ingram (8)
| LeBron James (10)
| Staples Center18,997
| 30–32
|- bgcolor=ffcccc
| 63
| March 2
| @ Phoenix
| 
| LeBron James (27)
| LeBron James (9)
| LeBron James (16)
| Talking Stick Resort Arena18,055
| 30–33
|- bgcolor=ffcccc
| 64
| March 4
| LA Clippers
| 
| LeBron James (27)
| Rajon Rondo (10)
| Rajon Rondo (12)
| Staples Center18,997
| 30–34
|- bgcolor=ffcccc
| 65
| March 6
| Denver
| 
| LeBron James (31)
| James, Rondo (7)
| Rajon Rondo (11)
| Staples Center18,997
| 30–35
|-bgcolor=ffcccc
| 66
| March 9
| Boston
| 
| LeBron James (30)
| LeBron James (10)
| LeBron James (12)
| Staples Center18,997
| 30–36
|-bgcolor=ccffcc
| 67
| March 12
| @ Chicago
| 
| LeBron James (36)
| JaVale McGee (11)
| Rajon Rondo (10)
| United Center21,359
| 31–36
|-bgcolor=ffcccc
| 68
| March 14
| @ Toronto
| 
| LeBron James (29)
| JaVale McGee (9)
| Rajon Rondo (8)
| Scotiabank Arena19,962
| 31–37
|-bgcolor=ffcccc
| 69
| March 15
| @ Detroit
| 
| JaVale McGee (20)
| JaVale McGee (13)
| Kyle Kuzma (10)
| Little Caesars Arena20,768
| 31–38
|-bgcolor=ffcccc
| 70
| March 17
| @ New York
| 
| LeBron James (33)
| McGee, Williams (7)
| James, Kuzma (8)
| Madison Square Garden19,812
| 31–39
|-bgcolor=ffcccc
| 71
| March 19
| @ Milwaukee
| 
| Kentavious Caldwell-Pope (35)
| JaVale McGee (11)
| Rajon Rondo (10)
| Fiserv Forum17,879
| 31–40
|-bgcolor=ffcccc
| 72
| March 22
| Brooklyn
| 
| JaVale McGee (33)
| JaVale McGee (20)
| LeBron James (14)
| Staples Center18,997
| 31–41
|-bgcolor=ccffcc
| 73
| March 24
| Sacramento
| 
| James, Kuzma (29)
| JaVale McGee (14)
| LeBron James (11)
| Staples Center18,997
| 32–41
|-bgcolor=ccffcc
| 74
| March 26
| Washington
| 
| Kentavious Caldwell-Pope (29)
| JaVale McGee (15)
| LeBron James (14)
| Staples Center18,997
| 33–41
|-bgcolor=ffcccc
| 75
| March 27
| @ Utah
| 
| Kyle Kuzma (21)
| JaVale McGee (13)
| Rajon Rondo (6)
| Vivint Smart Home Arena18,306
| 33–42
|-bgcolor=ccffcc
| 76
| March 29
| Charlotte
| 
| LeBron James (23)
| JaVale McGee (9)
| Rajon Rondo (17)
| Staples Center18,997
| 34–42
|-bgcolor=ccffcc
| 77
| March 31
| @ New Orleans
| 
| Rajon Rondo (24)
| JaVale McGee (12)
| Rajon Rondo (16)
| Smoothie King Center18,562
| 35–42

|-bgcolor=ffcccc
| 78
| April 2
| @ Oklahoma City
| 
| Kentavious Caldwell-Pope (23)
| Rajon Rondo (10)
| Rajon Rondo (9)
| Chesapeake Energy Arena18,203
| 35–43
|-bgcolor=ffcccc
| 79
| April 4
| Golden State
| 
| Johnathan Williams (17)
| McGee, J. Williams (13)
| Alex Caruso (6)
| Staples Center18,997
| 35–44
|-bgcolor=ccffcc
| 80
| April 5
| @ LA Clippers
| 
| Alex Caruso (32)
| Caruso, J. Jones, McGee (10)
| Rajon Rondo (12)
| Staples Center17,910
| 36–44
|-bgcolor=ccffcc
| 81
| April 7
| Utah
| 
| Kentavious Caldwell-Pope (32)
| Jemerrio Jones (16)
| Alex Caruso (11)
| Staples Center18,997
| 37–44
|-bgcolor=ffcccc
| 82
| April 9
| Portland
| 
| Kentavious Caldwell-Pope (32)
| Jemerrio Jones (15)
| Alex Caruso (13)
| Staples Center18,997
| 37–45

Player statistics

|-
| align="left"| || align="center"| PG
| 47 || 45 || 1,423 || 251 || 255 || 69 || 19 || 465
|-
| align="left"|† || align="center"| PF
| 26 || 2 || 277 || 60 || 25 || 9 || 10 || 181
|-
| align="left"| || align="center"| PG
| 22 || 0 || 120 || 25 || 15 || 9 || 4 || 19
|-
| align="left"|≠ || align="center"| SG
| 19 || 16 || 524 || 50 || 20 || 16 || 7 || 177
|-
| align="left"| || align="center"| SG
| style=";"|82 || 23 || 2,035 || 238 || 110 || style=";"|73 || 13 || 938
|-
| align="left"| || align="center"| PG
| 25 || 4 || 531 || 67 || 77 || 24 || 9 || 229
|-
| align="left"|≠ || align="center"| C
| 48 || 6 || 786 || 268 || 31 || 19 || 22 || 147
|-
| align="left"| || align="center"| SG
| 67 || 22 || 1,715 || 248 || 93 || 64 || 40 || 525
|-
| align="left"|≠ || align="center"| SG
| 4 || 0 || 15 || 2 || 0 || 1 || 0 || 0
|-
| align="left"| || align="center"| SF
| 52 || 52 || 1,760 || 267 || 154 || 28 || 31 || 950
|-
| align="left"| || align="center"| SF
| 55 || 55 || 1,937 || 465 || style=";"|454 || 72 || 33 || style=";"|1,505
|-
| align="left"|≠ || align="center"| SF
| 6 || 2 || 143 || 49 || 13 || 7 || 5 || 27
|-
| align="left"| || align="center"| PF
| 70 || style=";"|68 || style=";"|2,314 || 382 || 178 || 41 || 26 || 1,308
|-
| align="left"|≠ || align="center"| PG
| 4 || 0 || 19 || 0 || 3 || 1 || 0 || 10
|-
| align="left"| || align="center"| C
| 75 || 62 || 1,671 || style=";"|566 || 52 || 47 || style=";"|148 || 897
|-
| align="left"|≠ || align="center"| PF
| 17 || 4 || 265 || 44 || 14 || 4 || 11 || 100
|-
| align="left"|† || align="center"| SF
| 39 || 0 || 420 || 34 || 33 || 13 || 1 || 127
|-
| align="left"| || align="center"| PG
| 46 || 29 || 1,369 || 243 || 367 || 57 || 7 || 424
|-
| align="left"| || align="center"| SG
| 68 || 3 || 1,123 || 215 || 140 || 41 || 7 || 491
|-
| align="left"| || align="center"| C
| 43 || 5 || 446 || 85 || 24 || 11 || 13 || 207
|-
| align="left"| || align="center"| C
| 24 || 0 || 372 || 99 || 13 || 8 || 7 || 157
|-
| align="left"|† || align="center"| C
| 33 || 12 || 516 || 162 || 25 || 4 || 27 || 281
|}
After all games.
‡Waived during the season
†Traded during the season
≠Acquired during the season

Transactions

Signing of LeBron James
On July 9, 2018, superstar LeBron James signed a four-year, $154 million contract with the Lakers after playing a second stint with his hometown Cleveland Cavaliers. He led the team to their first championship title in 2016, and led them to the NBA Finals 4 other times (2007, 2015, 2017, and 2018). This marked his second time leaving the Cavs, after controversially doing so in 2010 to join the Miami Heat, where he led the team to 4 consecutive NBA Finals appearances, winning back-to-back in 2012 and 2013. The signing also briefly intensified the Celtics–Lakers rivalry, as his former Cavs teammate Kyrie Irving was traded to the Boston Celtics the year before and when former Celtics star Rajon Rondo joined LeBron in Los Angeles. Irving played 2 seasons for the Celtics before signing with the Brooklyn Nets during the 2019 offseason.

Trades

Free agency

Re-signed

Additions

Subtractions

References

2017-18
Los Angeles Lakers
Los Angeles Lakers
Los Angeles Lakers
Lakers
Lakers